Sir William Hustler (–1730), of Acklam, Yorkshire, and Little Hatfield, Holderness, Yorkshire was an English draper and Whig politician who sat in the English and British House of Commons between 1695 and 1710. He was a member of the Society for Promoting Christian Knowledge and was great patron of charity schools.

Early life

Hustler was the eldest son of William Hustler of Acklam and his wife Grace Savile, daughter of Sir John Savile of Lupset, near Wakefield, Yorkshire.   He was knighted on  14 May 1673 and succeeded his father in 1678.  On  8 July 1680, he married Lady Anne Wentworth, widow of Sir Matthew Wentworth of Bretton, Yorkshire, and daughter of William Osbaldeston of Hunmanby, Yorkshire. He built Acklam Hall in Cleveland in the early 1680s

Career
Hustler was returned unopposed as Member of Parliament for Northallerton at the 1695 English general election on the interest of the Whig Sir William Robinson, 1st Baronet. He signed the Association, but was absent from the division on the attainder of Sir John Fenwick. He managed a bill in April 1698 to make it easier to return juries to serve at the assizes and throughout his career managed many bills through the House, often private bills. At the 1698 English general election he was again returned unopposed and was listed as a member of the Country party and later as a supporter of the Whig Junto. He was returned unopposed in the first general election 1701, and during the year became  vice president of the newly founded Society for the Propagation of the Gospel in Foreign Parts. At the second general election of 1701, he was again returned  unopposed as a Whig  for Northallerton and acted frequently as a teller.

At the 1702 English general election, Hustler was returned as MP for both Northallerton and  Ripon. He chose to sit for Ripon, probably as part of an electoral agreement on behalf of John Aislabie with whom he exchanged places.   He was returned unopposed again for   Northallerton  at the 1705 English general election and voted for the Court candidate as Speaker  on 25 October 1705. At the 1708 British general election, he was returned unopposed as Whig MP for Northallerton once more. He supported the naturalization of the Palatines in 1709 and voted for the impeachment of Henry Sacheverell in 1710. He was defeated at the 1710 British general election, when he   came bottom of the poll. He did not stand for Parliament again. As a member of Society for the Promotion of Christian Knowledge he was busy establishing charity schools in Wakefield.

Death and legacy
Hustler died at Acklam on 20 August 1730. He had three sons of whom one predeceased him, and four daughters. He settled his estates in tail on his sons Robert and James with remainder to his daughters. Acklam Hall is now a weddings and corporate events centre.

References 

1655 births
1730 deaths
People from Middlesbrough
English MPs 1695–1698
English MPs 1698–1700
English MPs 1702–1705
English MPs 1705–1707
Members of the Parliament of Great Britain for English constituencies
British MPs 1707–1708
British MPs 1708–1710
Knights Bachelor